NatCon may refer to: